Carl Walker Metzgar (born October 1, 1981) was first elected to serve the Pennsylvania 69th Legislative District in November 2008.

Career
In addition to serving as a state representative in the Pennsylvania House of Representatives, Metzgar is an attorney in Somerset and Bedford counties.  He is a member of the Somerset County and the Pennsylvania Bar Associations. Metzgar currently sits on the Committee On Ethics, Consumer Affairs, and Liquor Control committees.

Personal
Metzgar was born and raised in Somerset County and spent much of his childhood raising cattle and helping his family on their farm.  He graduated from Berlin Brothersvalley High School in 2000.  He graduated from Frostburg State University with bachelor's degrees in political science and criminal justice.  Metzgar went on to Duquesne University's School of Law, where he received the Judge Manning Award for highest achievement in trial advocacy.

References

External links
Representative Carl Walker Metzgar's Official website
PA House Profile

Republican Party members of the Pennsylvania House of Representatives
21st-century American politicians
People from Somerset County, Pennsylvania
1981 births
Living people
People from Somerset, Pennsylvania
Frostburg State University alumni
Duquesne University School of Law alumni
Pennsylvania lawyers